Third World Quarterly is a peer-reviewed academic journal published by Routledge, established in 1979. , its editor-in-chief is Shahid Qadir. It was published eight times per year until 2011 when publication increased to ten times per year. It is now published monthly.

According to the Journal Citation Reports, the journal had an impact factor of 2.156 in 2018, ranking it 11th out of 41 journals in the category "Development Studies."

Controversy
In September 2017, the journal attracted controversy after it published an article entitled "The Case for Colonialism" by political scientist Bruce Gilley. This was described by Portia Roelofs and Max Gallien of the London School of Economics as "a travesty, the academic equivalent of a Trump tweet, clickbait with footnotes." Oxford theologian Nigel Biggar himself became the subject of controversy after defending Gilley's article.

On 19 September 2017, a large number of the journal's editorial board resigned in protest citing a flawed peer review process for the colonialism submission and inaccurate statements from the editor-in-chief, Shahid Qadir. In all, 15 of the 34 members of the international editorial board were signatories to the resignation letter, and a petition to retract the piece at Change.org had more than 10,000 supporters. Board member Noam Chomsky opposed the retraction, saying "Rebuttal offers a great opportunity for education, not only in this case."

References

External links
 

Area studies journals
Development studies journals
English-language journals
Monthly journals
Publications established in 1979
Taylor & Francis academic journals